The Rehala Falls (also Rahala, Rahalla or Rahla) is a cascade/punchbowl type waterfall located 16km north of Manali on the Leh–Manali Highway south of the Rohtang Pass within the Himalayan mountain range. The Rehala waterfall is a tourist attraction in the state of Himachal Pradesh, India. The waterfall is surrounded by a forest of Birch and Deodar trees. The waterfall freezes when the temperature drops below freezing point. The location is surrounded by several hiking and climbing trails.

References

Cascade waterfalls
Punch bowl waterfalls
Waterfalls of Himachal Pradesh
Geography of Kullu district
Manali, Himachal Pradesh
Waterfalls of India